Babblewick Hall was a radio comedy broadcast on BBC Radio 4 written by Scott Cherry. It was set in eighteenth-century Britain and told the story of Fenton Babblewick, a well-meaning but sometimes confused squire played by Nicholas Le Prevost, and his clever Scottish servant Augustus Snipe, played by Forbes Masson. The show consisted of two series. The first, with six weekly episodes, ran from 27 December 1995 to 31 January 1996. The second ran from 4 September to 25 September 1998.

Cast
Nicholas Le Prevost as Fenton Babblewick
Forbes Masson as Mr Augustus Snipe
David Antrobus as Barney

Episodes

Series 1

Series 2

External links
Babblewick Hall — brief details of each episode

BBC Radio comedy programmes
1995 radio programme debuts